Firefly is the sixth studio album by the Norwegian hard rock band TNT. It was released in 1997.

Track listing

Personnel

Band
 Tony Harnell – vocals
 Ronni Le Tekrø – guitars, lead vocals on "Moonflower"
 Morty Black – bass guitar

Associated members
 Dag Stokke – keyboards
 Frode Lamøy – drums, percussion (credited as Frode Hansen)

Additional personnel
 John Macaluso – drums, percussion on "Soldier of the Light"

Album credits
 Produced by TNT
 "Soldier of the Light" produced by Bob Icon.
 Recorded in StudioStudio, Norway
 Engineered by Dag Stokke
 Second engineers: Kjartan Hesthagen, Erland Hvalby, Ronni Le Tekrø
 "Only the Thief" was recorded outdoors on alternative instruments
 Vocals for "Heaven's Gone" recorded at Millbrook Sound Studios, NY, by Paul Orofino
 Mixed and mastered by Chris Tsangarides

Sources
https://web.archive.org/web/20070213021031/http://www.ronniletekro.com/discography-album-19.html

1997 albums
TNT (Norwegian band) albums